Atlanta meteori is a species of sea snail, a holoplanktonic marine gastropod mollusk in the family Atlantidae.

Description

Distribution

References

Atlantidae
Gastropods described in 1972